The Serbian First League (Serbian: Прва лига Србије; Prva liga Srbije) is the second-highest football league in Serbia (then Serbia and Montenegro). The league is operated by the Serbian FA. 20 teams competed in this league for the 2005–06 season, which was the league's inaugural season. Two teams were promoted to the Serbian SuperLiga and six were relegated the Serbian League, the third-highest division overall in the Serbian football league system.

League table

External links
Prva liga Srbije at Srbijasport
Tables and results at RSSSF

Serbian First League seasons
2005–06 in Serbian football leagues
Serbia